The men's team pursuit cycling event at the 1936 Summer Olympics took place on 6 to 8 August and was one of six events at the 1936 Olympics.

Results

Round 1

The top eight teams by time advanced to the second round. Bulgaria competed alone in its heat. Italy (heat 1), Denmark (heat 3), and Germany (heat 6) each briefly held the Olympic record in turn before France (heat 7) finished the round with it. The Dutch team was close to catching the American team before two riders crashed.

Round 2

The teams with the four best times from the second round advanced to the semifinals.

Semifinals

The winning team in each semifinal advanced to the gold medal final. The losers competed in the bronze medal final.

 Semifinal 1

 Semifinal 2

Finals

 Gold medal final

 Bronze medal final

References

 1936 Official Report.

Cycling at the 1936 Summer Olympics
Cycling at the Summer Olympics – Men's team pursuit
Track cycling at the 1936 Summer Olympics